Ports of Call is a 1986 business simulation game developed by German duo Rolf-Dieter Klein and Martin Ulrich, and published by Aegis Interactive Entertainment. It was initially released for AmigaOS. After a subsequent early release for DOS it was also made available to a number of different platforms over the years, including Windows, iOS, Android and as a browser game.

Gameplay
The game simulates the management of a global freight transport company, where the player charters freight, and, using the accumulated profit, can buy more and better ships. Minigames include manually piloting your ship into a specified berth in the harbour and picking up survivors from a liferaft. The original version provided multiplayer capability in the form of hot seat.

Reception
Roy Wagner reviewed the game for Computer Gaming World, and stated that "Ports of Call provides plenty of challenge without being bogged down with lots of economic details."

Reviews
ASM (Aktueller Software Markt) - Mar, 1988
ASM (Aktueller Software Markt) - Dec, 1990
Amiga Joker (Jul, 1991)
Happy Computer (May, 1988)
Power Play (Apr, 1988)

References

External links
Review in Info
Review in Amiga World
Article in Amazing Computing
Review in Amazing Computing
Review in Amiga Club Magazine
Review in Commodore Magazine
Review in Arcades (French)

DOS games
1986 video games
Amiga games
Android (operating system) games
Business simulation games
Games commercially released with DOSBox
IOS games
Naval video games
Video games developed in Germany